The Midcounties Co-operative, branded as Your Co-op, is a consumer co-operative in the United Kingdom with over 700,000 members. Registered in England under the Co-operative and Community Benefit Societies Act 2014, it is a member of Co-operatives UK and the Co-operative Retail Trading Group.

The Society's principal activity is retailing in parts of the West Midlands, South West, and South East regions, however some of its businesses do trade nationally. Its trading groups are Food, Travel, Phone Co-op, Post Office, Childcare and Flexible Benefits. The society is also active in recruiting electricity and gas customers  through its Co-op Energy brand, and in community-owned energy generation through a partnership with Octopus Energy.

The Midcounties Co-operative has its headquarters in Warwick, Warwickshire, with trading outlets in Berkshire, Buckinghamshire, Oxfordshire, Gloucestershire, Wiltshire, Shropshire, the West Midlands, Worcestershire and the surrounding counties, but also has a national trading presence through its Travel, Childcare, Phone Co-op and Flexible Benefits businesses.

As of 2019, Midcounties generated £1.5bn of sales and had over 500 trading sites. Trade with members as a proportion of total sales was 42%.

The Midcounties Co-operative invests in the communities in which it trades through responsible trading, local sourcing, community projects and charitable work. In 2018/2019 Midcounties paid out £1.6million in community and charity giving, paying out £1.3 million to its members as a share of the profits.

In the last full year of trading, 2018/19, Midcounties recorded sales of £1.55bn (£1.48bn 2017/18) and an operating profit before exceptional items of £8.2m (£10.9m 2017/18). The Society had £39.2m in bank debt (£54.1m 2017/18) and a £41.3m (£48.5m 2017/18) pension deficit as at 26 January 2019. Society membership was over 700,000 in 2019, up 11% over the year and a 22% increase over a three-year period.

The Society is run by a non-executive Board of 16 Directors, which is chaired by the Society's President. The members of the Board are elected directly by the members. The current President is Helen Wiseman.

History

The Midcounties Co-operative was formed in 2005, by the merger of the Oxford, Swindon and Gloucester Co-operative Society and the West Midlands Co-operative Society. As a result, the Society's geographical trading area spans ten counties: Berkshire, Gloucestershire, Northamptonshire, Oxfordshire, Shropshire, Staffordshire, Warwickshire, West Midlands, Wiltshire, and Worcestershire. Following the inception and growth of the Travel, Childcare, Flexible Benefits and Energy businesses, it is now a nationally trading Society.

Some of the earliest predecessor societies that combined with others to eventually form The Midcounties Co-operative are:

Businesses

The Midcounties Co-operative operates a range of businesses in Food, Travel, Healthcare, Funeral, Childcare, Energy, Post Offices, Flexible Benefits
and Telecoms.

Food
The Midcounties Co-operative is one of the largest independent food retailers in the country with 309 stores, operating as Your Coop Food

Pharmacy
In 2018 the Midcounties Co-operative completed a review of its Healthcare business selling 21 of its 29 pharmacies branches to focus on its digital healthcare offering. The pharmacy group controls the cooppharmacy.coop website and in 2013 launched a new Online Doctor service providing online medical care and prescriptions direct to customers' homes.

Funeralcare
The Midcounties Co-operative, which operated as The Co-operative Funeralcare, provided 85 funeral homes and three masonry sites. The group had over 150 years' experience in providing funeral care to its local communities. After a business review in 2021, the majority of funeral homes were transferred to Central England Co-operative.

Travel
The Midcounties Co-operative operates 60 travel branches across Midcounties' trading area and controls the Cooptravel.co.uk and Co-operativeski.co.uk websites. The Midcounties Co-operative travel business is branded "Your Coop Travel (Part of the Midcounties Co-operative)". It is distinct from the former business The Co-operative Travel which was owned and operated as a joint venture by Thomas Cook, The Co-operative Group and Central England Co-operative. That business was rebranded to the Thomas Cook name during 2017–18, its branches subsequently being acquired by Hays Travel upon the liquidation of Thomas Cook.

Childcare
In 2002, the Society became the first UK co-operative to open a children's day care facility. Your Coop Childcare now operates 44 nurseries across the UK. The acquisition of the Buffer Bear nursery chain in 2010 saw its Childcare business begin to trade nationally, with nurseries spanning from Newcastle to Southampton.

Co-operative Flexible Benefits
In 2019, Co-operative Flexible Benefits had gross sales of £25 million, however, the childcare voucher scheme which it operated was closed to new entrants in October 2018. As a result, the childcare voucher business is now being wound down, the process will take around three years. To replace it, the Society is developing a Reward and Recognition offer for employers to promote high performance, motivation and engagement.

Post Office
In 2016/17, The Midcounties Co-operative operated 55 post offices with gross sales of £2.9 million.

Utilities
On 28 April 2018 the members of The Phone Co-op voted to transfer its engagements to (i.e. merge with) Midcounties. A confirmatory vote held after the Midcounties AGM on 12 May 2018 was passed, allowing Midcounties to thus broaden its utilities offer. The merger took place on 1 June 2018, with members of The Phone Co-op joining Midcounties membership. In 2018/19 The Phone Co-op had gross sales of £6.7 million.

Midcounties Co-operative also has an agreement with Octopus Group to market and distribute energy products under the Co-op Energy brand, following the sale of its interest in the Co-op Energy supply business to Octopus Energy in 2019. A joint venture also targets investment in new community energy projects, provides practical support to community groups and aims to increase the volume of energy purchased from community schemes; thereby encouraging more small-scale generation across the UK.

Former businesses
Motorworld (also known as The Co-operative Motors) was a co-operative car dealership.  Its franchises included Volkswagen, Audi, Volvo, Mitsubishi, Mazda and Hyundai.  The Midcounties Co-operative intended it to be the most socially responsible car dealership in the UK, but sold it off in January 2010 at a loss of £2.4 million.

Energy supply

The Midcounties Co-operative's energy business, The Co-operative Energy, supplies gas and electricity to UK homes. The business was established in 2010, launching as a lately internet based provider but was largely unknown.  criticised by customers in 2015 after a failed IT upgrade to its online customer service and billing system caused numerous problems and a large backlog in dealing with issues. In the first quarter of 2015 it was the fourth most complained about utility company, measured in complaints per thousand customers. In subsequent quarters it became the second worst and then the worst for the period July–September according to the official Energy Ombudsman. By the end of 2016 these issues had been resolved and the company was paying out £1.8 million in compensation to customers.

Midcounties Co-operative announced the sale of its energy supply business, including Flow Energy, GB Energy and Co-op Energy, to Octopus Group for an undisclosed sum in August 2019. Customers were transferred to Octopus Energy, while Midcounties will continue to market and distribute energy products under the Co-op Energy brand.

Newspaper Delivery to homes

The society briefly ran a service offering newspaper delivery. It's grocery stores continue to sell newspapers but the traditional newsagent home delivery business was exited.

Pharmacy 

Midcounties exited Healthcare in 2023.

Health Food Store 

The society operated a single store, with a small dedicated team, for approximately twenty years.

Funerals 

After a strategic review, Midcounties exited the Funeral Director market, selling its two depots, its pre-payment service and the majority of its outlets to a sister society via a transfer of engagements. While the decisions made where commercial, the co-operative character of the transaction meant the regulator required the final transfer of engagements to be voted through by members at two special meetings.

Member Share Account Kiosks 

Traditional staffed counters inside co-op premises for members to conduct withdrawals and subscriptions into their share accounts (common when few people had bank accounts) have been withdrawn. The service remains accessible via post at the head office, where a team of 4 administer account books and certificates. Subscriptions are by application only and at the members risk.

Membership
Membership is open to all, with members receiving a share of the profits in the form of dividend. Members are entitled to a share in the business after investing a minimum of £1, which is automatically deducted from the first dividend payment. The scheme is run in conjunction with The Co-operative Group membership, allowing a Midcounties card to be used at businesses operated by other participating societies.

The membership card allows members to collect points either by spending in stores or attending events. Points are converted to vouchers twice yearly, usually in May and November. The vouchers can be spent in any of The Midcounties Co-operative's trading outlets, paid into the member's share account or donated to charity.

Also members receive 10% off their first shop. And also get exclusive members prices.

Values and responsible trading
The Midcounties Co-operative has four values on which the business is run, consisting of Democracy, Openness, Equality and Social Responsibility. These values are derived from the Co-operative Movement's founding values. The society is run in a democratic way, with its board of directors voted for by its members, it aims to be open and honest with its colleagues and members, strives to promote and embrace equality and is committed to helping its local communities through grant giving and volunteer work, and it also aims to be more environmentally friendly.

Midcounties Co-operative did, however, fail to pay the national minimum wage to some newspaper delivery staff for four years, and following a HM Revenue and Customs investigation in 2016 paid more than £14,000 back pay due to one staff member. This is the highest single payout made in the UK following a HMRC investigation. In 2014 an internal complaint had been made, but this had been rejected by Midcounties Co-operative management. Back pay may be due to up to 200 other newspaper delivery staff. The breach was due to Midcounties Co-operative unreasonably estimating the time taken to carry out a delivery round. Additionally one member of staff was working seven days a week and taking little holiday, a breach of the working time regulations.

Community work
The Midcounties Co-operative has a strong commitment to investing in the communities in which it trades through responsible trading, local sourcing, community projects and charitable work. To this end the co-op invested 17.6% of its 2013–2014 pre-tax profits (£1.8m) into the communities in which it trades. This figure is significantly higher than the average value for large UK co-ops (6.9%) or other rival supermarkets (2.4%). In 2014 the society provided support for over 10,000 community groups and encouraged colleagues to volunteer over 23,500 hours to support local communities.

The co-op supports 40 local foodbanks and in 2014 enabled 10,000 products to be donated from its food stores.

Fair Tax
The society firmly believes that community retailers should pay all taxes which are due and should not engage in aggressive artificial tax avoidance. In 2013 the society set out its tax charter and in 2014 became one of the first three businesses in the UK to be awarded the Fair Tax Mark. This certification shows that the business is transparent about its tax affairs and does not engage in tax avoidance.

Environment
Energy consumption across the business is down by 10% since 2009 and own brand packaging is down by 39% since 2006. The society recycles over 80% of its waste (2014) with food waste being converted into renewable energy. All electricity used by the business comes from renewable sources.

In contrast to this, and the group's stated environmental values, the Co-operative Energy business, run by The Midcounties Co-operative, purchases only 4% of its electricity from renewable sources. It also has a relatively large portion of coal within its main fuel mix.

Co-operative Development
The co-op provided £100,000 of support for co-operative development though its 'Co-operative Futures' project. In 2014, 83 co-operatives were advised or supported by Co-operative Futures and 17 new registrations of co-operatives were completed. Its total commitment to supporting the growth of co-operatives in 2014 was £280,000.

Key achievements
The Society was ranked in the Sunday Times '25 Best Big Companies to Work For' list, which is based on employee feedback, in 2011 (24th place), 2012 (24th place), 2013 (13th place) and 2014 (10th place).

The Society was awarded Platinum in the Business in the Community Corporate Responsibility Index 2012 and 2013. In 2014 the society was awarded 4.5 stars in the index, reflecting a score of 98%, and in 2015 was one of four companies to achieve the highest 5-star rating.

In 2018/19 colleagues, members and customers donated over 100,000 items to foodbanks.

See also
British co-operative movement
Credit unions in the United Kingdom

References

External links

Coop Pharmacy
Coop Travel
Cooperative Ski

Business services companies established in 2005
Retail companies established in 2005
Consumers' co-operatives of the United Kingdom
Supermarkets of the United Kingdom
Companies based in Warwick
Monumental masons
British companies established in 2005